Vladislav Mustafin (Владислав Мустафин, born 26 September 1995) is a Uzbekistani swimmer. He competed in the men's 100 metre breaststroke event at the 2016 Summer Olympics.

Major results

Individual

Relay

 South Korea originally won the bronze medal, but was later disqualified after Park Tae-hwan tested positive for Nebido.
 In heat (he didn't participated in the final)

References

External links
 

1995 births
Living people
Uzbekistani male breaststroke swimmers
Olympic swimmers of Uzbekistan
Swimmers at the 2016 Summer Olympics
Sportspeople from Tashkent
Asian Games medalists in swimming
Swimmers at the 2014 Asian Games
Medalists at the 2014 Asian Games
Asian Games bronze medalists for Uzbekistan
Swimmers at the 2018 Asian Games
Uzbekistani male butterfly swimmers
21st-century Uzbekistani people